The Narewka (Belarusian Нараўка) River is a left-bank tributary of the Narew River in western Belarus and northeastern Poland.

Etymology
The Narewka River's name comes from a Proto-Indo-European root, *nr, primarily associated with "water" (compare Narva, Neretva, Neris, Ner, and Nur).

Geography
The Narewka flows through the European region known as the Wysoczyzny Podlasko – Bialoruskie (Podlasie–Belarus Plateau) in Poland's Podlasie Province and Belarus' Hrodna Voblast.  A major part of the river flows through the Białowieża Forest. 
The Narewka River is the main watercourse of the Polish part of the Białowieża Forest.

The river is 61.1 km long, including 21.7 kilometers in the Republic of Belarus.

Catchment (basin) covers an area Narewka 710.7 km sq., of which the Polish border is 491.32 km. Within the forest is 380 km2 catchment area, part of which falls in the Białowieża National Park. Catchment forest cover is 49.9%. Until dry, the Narewka flowed through quite a muddy valley. In the 1960s has been draining uroczyska "Wild Nikora.

The width of the trough Narewka ranges from 5 to 15 m (at the mouth). The maximum depth at the measuring point in Bialowieza: 201 cm. The rate of flow is 2 km / hr.

History
Narewka River is marked on the first map of Bialowieza, line drawn in 1784 by the royal surveyor Michael Połchowskiego. The documents appear much earlier.

In December 1409 Władysław Jagiełło took place in Bialowieza Forest a great hunt, making the stocks of meat before the battle of Grunwald. The meat is in the spring of next year, the river was floated Narewka, Narew and the Vistula to Plock.

In 1559 a partial separation was carried out from Bialowieza Forest Bielsko (Ladzkiej). Narewka River to the mouth of the Narew, along with the river Wieliczanka constituted the boundary between forests.

Cities and towns
Villages: Białowieża, Pogorzelce, Narewka, Nowe Lewkowo and Stare Lewkowo.

Tributaries

 L Waliczówka
 L Jabłoniówka
 R Bobrówka
 L Okulinka
 L Jelonka
 R Braszcza
 R Hwoźna
 R Sirota
 L Przedzielna
 R Orłówka
 L Łutownia
 R Krynica
 R Złota
 L Jelonka
 L Pierierownica
 L Tisovka

References

Rivers of Brest Region
Rivers of Poland
Rivers of Podlaskie Voivodeship
Białowieża Forest
International rivers of Europe
Rivers of Belarus